Adriana Iliescu (born 31 May 1938) is a Romanian retired university teacher, philologist and author of children's novels. She received international media attention in 2005, when she gave birth to daughter Eliza at age 66, making her the oldest birth mother in the world until this record was broken in 2006 by María del Carmen Bousada de Lara. Eliza, who was delivered at Giuleşti Maternity Hospital on 16 January 2005 in Bucharest, is Iliescu's biological (but not genetic) child, since she gestated in Iliescu's womb but was conceived by an ovum and sperm donated anonymously.

Pregnancy 

Iliescu was first given hormone treatment to reverse menopause in 1995 and in vitro fertilisation (three zygotes with sperm and ovum from two anonymous donors) in 2004, becoming pregnant with triplets.  After ten weeks one of the three fetuses failed to progress and died.  The remaining two fetuses, both girls, weighed just 1.45 kilograms (3.19 pounds) and 0.69 kilograms (1.54 pounds) after 33 weeks of pregnancy, but after complications the smaller of the two died in the womb.  Though doctors were expecting to perform a caesarian section soon after the 34th week, the death of one of the twins led to the decision to operate earlier than planned.  The surviving baby was expected to remain in hospital for six weeks.

International interest 

Romanian laws governing the process are currently under review and, to bring them in line with typical European legislation, may prevent any form of such treatment after the age of 50.

The story became international headline news, causing debate as to whether fertility treatment is ethical after a certain age.  The release of details about the pregnancy and birth was criticised when different information was reported by different news companies.  One primary source was a Realitatea TV interview with Iliescu conducted a month before the birth.  The age of Iliescu was reported as 67 by some sources and the exact details of the second, and in some reports third, fetus differed greatly.  For example, a CNN news website article was updated after a day, changing her age from 67 to 66. Gheorghe Borcean, head of the Romanian medical profession's ethics committee, commented: "A case of such prominence should require academic debates and not just one single television report."

Television, newspaper polls and discussions around the world asked the public what their opinion of the ethical decision was.

Works

Studies 
 Literatorul. Studiu monografic, Bucarest, 1968
 Revistele literare de la sjirsitul secolului al XlX-lea, Bucarest, 1972
 Realismul in literatura romana in secolul al XIX- lea, Bucarest, 1975
 Proza realista in secolul al XlX-lea, Bucarest, 1978

Books 
Domnisoara cu miozotis, 1970
 Insula,  1971
 Orasul, 1978

References 

1938 births
Living people
People from Craiova
In vitro fertilisation
Romanian philologists
Romanian essayists
Romanian writers